Bachia panoplia is a species of lizard in the family Gymnophthalmidae. It is endemic to Brazil.

References

Bachia
Reptiles of Brazil
Endemic fauna of Brazil
Reptiles described in 1965
Taxa named by Richard Thomas (herpetologist)